This is a list of people who have appeared on the front cover of Attitude, a gay lifestyle magazine that is printed monthly in the United Kingdom. If the person is openly LGBT, their identity will be mentioned in parentheses; sources can be found in the people's articles.

Statistics 
As of May 2010, Attitude created 151 magazines of which 106 covers have been dedicated to straight celebrities or politicians. Only 45 covers have been dedicated to gay celebrities. The longest stretch straight celebrities have not appeared on the cover is two months. Editor Matthew Todd has claimed has suggested there are not enough famous gay people to have them on the cover constantly and has made a point of putting celebrities on the cover such as Beth Ditto (first gay woman on an Attitude cover) and Kele Okereke (first black gay man on an Attitude cover). In January 2020, activists Yasmin Benoit and Anick Soni became the first asexual and intersex people on the cover, respectively.

Covers

References

Attitude
People on the cover of Attitude magazine
People on the cover of Attitude magazine
LGBT-related mass media in the United Kingdom